Scott Patent Hill is a mountain in Schoharie County, New York and partially in Albany County, New York. It is located south-southeast of Livingstonville. Steenburg Mountain is located south-southwest and Dutton Ridge is located north-northwest of Scott Patent Hill.

References

Mountains of Schoharie County, New York
Mountains of Albany County, New York
Mountains of New York (state)